Wardell Edwin Bond (April 9, 1903 – November 5, 1960) was an American film character actor who appeared in more than 200 films and starred in the NBC television series Wagon Train from 1957 to 1960. Among his best-remembered roles are Bert the cop in Frank Capra's It's a Wonderful Life (1946) and Captain Clayton in John Ford's The Searchers (1956).

Early life

Bond was born in Benkelman in Dundy County, Nebraska. The Bond family, John W., Mabel L., and sister Bernice, lived in Benkelman until 1919 when they moved to Denver, Colorado, where Ward graduated from East High School.

Bond attended the Colorado School of Mines and then went to the University of Southern California and played football on the same team as future USC coach Jess Hill. At 6' 2" and 195 pounds, Bond was a starting lineman on USC's first national championship team in 1928. He graduated from USC in 1931 with a Bachelor of Science degree in engineering.

Bond and John Wayne, who as Marion Robert Morrison, had played tackle for USC in 1926 before an injury ended his career, became lifelong friends and colleagues. Bond, Wayne, and the entire Southern Cal team were hired to appear in Salute (1929), a football film starring George O'Brien and directed by John Ford. During the filming of this movie, Bond and Wayne befriended Ford, and appeared in many of Ford's later films.

Film career

Bond made his screen debut in Salute and thereafter was a busy character actor, playing over 200 supporting roles. He appeared in 31 films released in 1935 and 23 in 1939. Rarely playing the lead in theatrical films,  he starred in the television series Wagon Train from 1957 until his death in 1960. He was frequently typecast in extremes, as either a friendly lawman or a brutal henchman. He had a long-time working relationship with directors John Ford and Frank Capra, performing in such films as The Searchers, Drums Along the Mohawk, The Quiet Man, They Were Expendable and Fort Apache for Ford, with whom he made 25 films, and It Happened One Night, It's a Wonderful Life, and Riding High for Capra. 

Among his other well-known films were Bringing Up Baby (1938), Gone with the Wind (1939), The Maltese Falcon (1941), Sergeant York (1941), Gentleman Jim (1942), Joan of Arc (1948), Rio Bravo (1959), and Raoul Walsh's 1930 widescreen wagon train epic The Big Trail, which also featured John Wayne, in his first leading role.

Bond later starred in the popular series Wagon Train from 1957 until his death. Wagon Train was inspired by the 1950 film Wagon Master, in which Bond also appeared. Wagon Master was influenced by the earlier The Big Trail. For Wagon Train, Bond was assigned the lead role of the crusty but compassionate Major Seth Adams, the trail master. 

Bond specifically asked that Terry Wilson be given the role of assistant trail boss Bill Hawks and that Frank McGrath play the cook, Charlie B. Wooster. Wilson and McGrath stayed with the series for the entire run, from 1957 to 1965, first on NBC and then on ABC.  After Bond's death, in 1960, the trail master role passed to John McIntire in 1961.

During the 1940s, Bond was a member of the conservative group called the Motion Picture Alliance for the Preservation of American Ideals, whose major platform was opposition to communists in the film industry. In 1960, Bond campaigned for Republican presidential nominee Richard M. Nixon. Bond died three days before Democrat John F. Kennedy narrowly defeated Nixon.

On the American Film Institute's "100 Years... 100 Movies" list—both the original and the tenth anniversary edition— Bond appears in the casts more often than any other actor, albeit always in a supporting role: It Happened One Night (1934), Bringing Up Baby (1938), Gone with the Wind (1939), The Grapes of Wrath (1940), The Maltese Falcon (1941), It's a Wonderful Life (1946), and The Searchers (1956).

Bond appeared in 13 films that were nominated for the Academy Award for Best Picture: Arrowsmith (1931/32), Lady for a Day (1933), It Happened One Night (1934) Dead End (1937), You Can't Take It with You (1938), Gone with the Wind (1939), The Grapes of Wrath (1940), The Long Voyage Home (1940), The Maltese Falcon (1941), Sergeant York (1941), It's a Wonderful Life (1946), The Quiet Man (1952), and Mister Roberts (1955).

Bond starred in 23 films with John Wayne:

 Words and Music – bit part (uncredited) (1929)
 Salute – Midshipman Harold (1929)
 The Lone Star Ranger – Townsperson at the Dance (uncredited) (1930)
 Born Reckless – Sergeant (1930)
 The Big Trail – Sid Bascomb (1930)
 Maker of Men – Pat (un-credited) (1931)
 Three Girls Lost – Airline Steward (un-credited) (1931)
 College Coach – Assistant Coach (un-credited) (1933)
 Conflict – Gus "Knockout" Carrigan (1936)
 The Long Voyage Home – Yank (1940)
 The Shepherd of the Hills – Wash Gibbs (1941)
 A Man Betrayed – Floyd (1941)
 Tall in the Saddle – Judge Robert Garvey (1944)
 Dakota – Jim Bender (1945)
 They Were Expendable –  BMC "Boats" Mulcahey (1945)
 3 Godfathers – Perley "Buck" Sweet (1948)
 Fort Apache – Sgt. Major Michael O'Rourke (1948)
 Operation Pacific – Commander John T. "Pop" Perry (1951)
 The Quiet Man – Father Peter Lonergan (1952)
 Hondo – Buffalo Baker (1953)
 Rookie of the Year – Buck Goodhue, Alias Buck Garrison (TV drama 1955)
 The Searchers – Reverend Captain Samuel Johnson Clayton (1956)
 The Wings of Eagles – John Dodge (1957)
 Rio Bravo – Pat Wheeler (1959)

Personal life
Bond married Doris Sellers Childs in 1936. They divorced in 1944. In 1954, he married Mary Louise Meyers. They were together until his death in 1960. Bond had epilepsy, which left him ineligible for military service during World War II.

Death 
Bond had a massive heart attack  when he and his wife were at a hotel in Dallas. He was pronounced dead at a hospital on November 5, 1960, at the age of 57. His close friend John Wayne gave the eulogy at his funeral. Bond's will bequeathed to Wayne the shotgun with which Wayne had once accidentally shot Bond on a hunting trip.

An urban myth states that country singer Johnny Horton died in an automobile accident while driving to see Bond at a hotel in Dallas to discuss a possible role in the fourth season of Wagon Train. Although Horton was indeed killed in a car crash at 1:30 am on November 5, 1960, and Bond died from a heart attack at noon that same day, the two events were unrelated. Horton was en route from Austin to Shreveport, Louisiana, not Dallas. Bond was in Dallas to attend a football game between Southern Methodist University and Texas A&M at the Cotton Bowl (the game ended in a scoreless tie).

Legacy 
For his contribution to the television industry, Bond has a star on the Hollywood Walk of Fame at 6933 Hollywood Boulevard. It was dedicated on February 8, 1960. In 2001, he was inducted into the Western Performers Hall of Fame at the National Cowboy & Western Heritage Museum in Oklahoma City. The Ward Bond Memorial Park is located in his birthplace, Benkelman, Nebraska.

Credits

Filmography

Noah's Ark (1928) as Flood Extra uncredited (film debut)
Words and Music (1929) as Bit Part (uncredited)
Salute (1929) as Midshipman Harold
So This Is College (1929) as USC Player-#30 (uncredited)
The Lone Star Ranger (1930) as Townsperson at the Dance (uncredited)
Born Reckless (1930) as Sargeant
Cheer Up and Smile (1930) as Boy at Sweetheart Dance (uncredited)
The Big Trail (1930) as Sid Bascom
Up The River (1930) as Inmate socked by Saint Louis (uncredited)
The Doorway to Hell (1930) as Policeman (uncredited)
A Connecticut Yankee (1931) as Queen's Knight (uncredited)
Quick Millions (1931) as Cop in Montge (uncredited)
Three Girls Lost (1931) as Airline Steward (uncredited) 
The Brat (1931) as Court Policeman (uncredited)
The Spider (1931) as Cop (uncredited)
Sob Sister (1931) as Ward (uncredited)
Over the Hill (1931) as Detective Escort (uncredited)
Arrowsmith (1931) as Cop (uncredited)
Maker of Men (1931) as Pat (uncredited)
Blonde Crazy (1931) as Highway Patrolman (uncredited)
The Greeks Had a Word for Them (1932) as Taxi Driver (uncredited)
High Speed (1932) as Ham
Careless Lady (1932) as Cop in Raid (uncredited)
The Trial of Vivienne Ware (1932) as Johnson (uncredited)
Bachelor's Affairs (1932) as Cop (uncredited)
Hello Trouble (1932) as "Heavy" Kennedy
Hold 'Em Jail (1932) as Football Player (uncredited)
White Eagle (1932) as Henchman Bart
Rackety Rax (1932) as "Bick" Gilligan
Virtue (1932) as Frank
Air Mail (1932) as Joe Barnes (uncredited)
Flesh (1932) as Muscles Manning (uncredited)
Sundown Rider (1932) as Gabe Powers
Lucky Devils (1933) as Crewman (uncredited)
State Trooper (1933)
Obey the Law (1933) as Kid Paris
 Unknown Valley (1933) as Elder Sneed
 When Strangers Marry (1933) as Billy McGuire
Heroes for Sale (1933) as Red (uncredited)
The Wrecker (1933) as Cramer
Lady for a Day (1933) as Mounted Policeman (uncredited)
Wild Boys of the Road (1933) as Red, the Raping Brakeman (uncredited)
 Police Car 17 (1933) as Bumps O'Neil
College Coach (1933) as Assistant Coach (uncredited)
Son of a Sailor (1933) as Joe (uncredited)
Straightaway (1933) as Hobo
The Fighting Code (1933) as Joe Krull
Frontier Marshal (1934) as Ben Murchison
School for Romance (1934, Short) as Husband
Speed Wings (1934) as Henchman (uncredited)
It Happened One Night (1934) as Bus Driver #1 (uncredited)
The Poor Rich (1934) as Motor Cop
The Fighting Ranger (1934) as Dave, Cougar Henchman
Voice in the Night (1934) as Bob Hall
Whirlpool (1934) as Farley
The Crime of Helen Stanley (1934) as Jack Baker
I'll Tell the World (1934) as Drigible Officer (uncredited)
The Most Precious Thing in Life (1934) as Head Coach Smith
Here Comes the Groom (1934) as Second Cop
A Man's Game (1934) as Dave Jordan
The Circus Clown (1934) as Unimpressed Man in Audience (uncredited)
The Defense Rests (1934) as Hood
The Affairs of Cellini (1934) as Palace Guard Finding Cellini's Clothes (uncredited)
Chained (1934) as Ship Steward (uncredited)
The Human Side (1934) as Cop
Girl in Danger (1934) as Wynkoski
Death on the Diamond (1934) as Security Guard in Kelly's Room (uncredited)
6 Day Bike Rider (1934) as First Officer (uncredited)
Against the Law (1934) as Tony Rizzo
Men of the Night (1934) as Detective John Connors
Broadway Bill (1934) as Morgan's Henchman (uncredited)
Grand Old Girl (1935) as Mr. Clark (Football Coach) (uncredited)
Under Pressure (1935) as Prize Fighter (uncredited)
Devil Dogs of the Air (1935) as Instructor
One New York Night (1935) as Policeman (uncredited)
Times Square Lady (1935) as Dugan (Hockey Player) (uncredited)
The Crimson Trail (1935) as Luke Long
Black Fury (1935) as Mac (Company Policeman)
Fighting Shadows (1935) as Brad Harrison
G Men (1935) as Gunman at the Train Station (uncredited)
Go Into Your Dance (1935) as Herman Lahey (uncredited)
Strangers All (1935) as Ward, Assistant Film Director on Film Set (uncredited)
Mary Jane's Pa (1935) as Roughneck Leader (uncredited)
The Headline Woman (1935) as Johnson, Reporter
Murder in the Fleet (1935) as 'Heavy' Johnson
Justice of the Range (1935) as Bob Brennan
Calm Yourself (1935) as Detective with Roscoe (uncredited)
She Gets Her Man (1935) as Chick
Little Big Shot (1935) as Kell's Henchman
His Night Out (1935) as Lanky
Waterfront Lady (1935) as Jess
The Last Days of Pompeii (1935) as Murmex of Carthage, a gladiator (uncredited)
Three Kids and a Queen (1935) as Relative (uncredited)
Western Courage (1935) as Lacrosse
Guard That Girl (1935) as Budge Edwards
I Found Stella Parish (1935) as Roman Soldier in Play (uncredited)
Broadway Hostess (1935) as Lucky's Henchman (uncredited)
Too Tough to Kill (1935) as Danny (Dynamite Foreman)
We're Only Human (1935) as Grover's Bank Robber (uncredited)
Hitch Hike Lady (1935) as Motorcycle Officer
Two in the Dark (1936) as Police in the Dark (uncredited)
Muss 'Em Up (1936) as John Doe, a Gangster
The Leathernecks Have Landed (1936) as Tex
Boulder Dam (1936) as Pa's Guest (uncredited)
Colleen (1936) as Sweeney (Second Officer) (uncredited)
The First Baby (1936) as Tough Guy (uncredited)
Pride of the Marines (1936) as Gunner Brady
The Case Against Mrs. Ames (1936) as Newspaper Buyer (uncredited)
Avenging Waters (1936) as Marve Slater
Fatal Lady (1936) as American Stage Manager (uncredited)
The Cattle Thief (1936) as Ranse Willard
Fury (1936) as Man (uncredited)
High Tension (1936) as Husky Man (uncredited)
The Bride Walks Out (1936) as Taxi Driver (uncredited)
White Fang (1936) as Thief (uncredited)
Crash Donovan (1936) as The Drill Master
Second Wife (1936) as 1st Partner Politician (uncredited)
They Met in a Taxi (1936) as Policeman (uncredited)
The Man Who Lived Twice (1936) as John 'Gloves' Baker
The Big Game (1936) as Gambler (uncredited)
Without Orders (1936) as Tim Casey
Legion of Terror (1936) as Don Foster
The Accusing Finger (1936) as Prison Guard (uncredited)
Conflict (1936) as Gus "Knockout" Carrigan
After the Thin Man (1936) as Party Guest (uncredited)
Woman-Wise (1937) as Kramer (uncredited)
You Only Live Once (1937) as Casey (Guard) (uncredited)
Devil's Playground (1937) as Sidecar Wilson
When's Your Birthday? (1937) as Police Detective (uncredited)
Park Avenue Logger (1937) as Paul Sangar
23 1/2 Hours' Leave (1937) as Top Sgt. Burke
The Soldier and the Lady (1937) as Tartar Guard (uncredited)
Night Key (1937) as Fingers
They Gave Him a Gun (1937) as MP (uncredited)
The Wildcatter (1937) as Johnson
Mountain Music (1937) as G-Man (uncredited)
A Fight to the Finish (1937) as Eddie Hawkins
The Singing Marine (1937) as First Sgt. (uncredited)
Marry the Girl (1937) as First Motorcycle Policeman (uncredited)
Topper (1937) as Eddie (Cab Driver Slugged by Topper) (uncredited)
Dead End (1937) as Doorman
Escape by Night (1937) as Peter 'Spudsy' Baker
The Game That Kills (1937) as Tom Ferguson
Music for Madame (1937) as Violets (uncredited)
The Westland Case (1937) as Connors (Death Row Inmate) (uncredited)
Fight for Your Lady (1937) as Mr. Walton (uncredited)
The Go Getter (1937) as Logger (scenes deleted)
Souls at Sea (1937) as Sailor (uncredited)
Penitentiary (1938) as Red Parsons (Prison Barber) (uncredited)
Of Human Hearts (1938) as Lout Laughing in Church (uncredited)
The Kid Comes Back (1938) as Spike (Sparring Partner) (uncredited)
Bringing Up Baby (1938) as Motorcycle Cop at Jail (uncredited)
Born to Be Wild (1938) as Bill Purvis
Hawaii Calls (1938) as Muller
Mr. Moto's Gamble (1938) as Biff Moram
Over the Wall (1938) as Eddie Edwards
The Adventures of Marco Polo (1938) as Mongol Guard (uncredited)
Flight into Nowhere (1938)
Gun Law (1938) as Pecos
Numbered Woman (1938)
Reformatory (1938) as Mac Grady
Professor Beware (1938) as Motorcycle Cop (uncredited)
Prison Break (1938) as Big Red Kincaid
The Amazing Dr. Clitterhouse (1938) as Tug
You Can't Take It with You (1938) as Mike, the Detective (uncredited)
Fugitives for a Night (1938) as Gambler in Fake Fight (uncredited)
Submarine Patrol (1938) as Seaman Olaf Swanson
The Law West of Tombstone (1938) as Mulligan P. Martinez
Going Places (1938) as Clarence, Policeman (uncredited)
They Made Me a Criminal (1939) as Lenihan
Made for Each Other (1939) as Jim Hatton (uncredited)
Pardon Our Nerve (1939) as Kid Ramsey
The Oklahoma Kid (1939) as Wes Handley
Trouble in Sundown (1939) as Henchman Dusty
Dodge City (1939) as Bud Taylor
Mr. Moto in Danger Island (1939) as Sailor Sam (wrestler) (uncredited)
Confessions of a Nazi Spy (1939) as an anti-Nazi American Legionnaire (uncredited)
Union Pacific (1939) as Tracklayer (uncredited)
The Return of the Cisco Kid (1939) as Accused Rustler
The Kid from Kokomo (1939) as Ladislaw Klewicki
Young Mr. Lincoln (1939) as John Palmer Cass
The Girl from Mexico (1939) as Mexican Pete, the Wrestler
Waterfront (1939) as Matt Hendler
Frontier Marshal (1939) as Town Marshal
Dust Be My Destiny (1939) as First Thug on Train (uncredited)
Drums Along the Mohawk (1939) as Adam Hartman
Heaven with a Barbed Wire Fence (1939) as Hunk
Gone with the Wind (1939) as Tom, Yankee Captain
The Cisco Kid and the Lady (1939) as Walton
Son of Frankenstein (1939) as Gendarme at Gate (uncredited)
The Grapes of Wrath (1940) as Needles Policeman
Little Old New York (1940) as Regan
Virginia City (1940) as Confederate Sgt. Checking Passengers (uncredited)
Buck Benny Rides Again (1940) as First Outlaw
The Mortal Storm (1940) as Franz
Sailor's Lady (1940) as Shore Patrolman
Kit Carson (1940) as Ape
City for Conquest (1940) as First Policeman (uncredited)
The Long Voyage Home (1940) as Yank
Santa Fe Trail (1940) as Townley
Tobacco Road (1941) as Lov Bensey
A Man Betrayed (1941) as Floyd
Sergeant York (1941) as Ike Botkin
The Shepherd of the Hills (1941) as Wash Gibbs
Manpower (1941) as Eddie Adams
Doctors Don't Tell (1941) as Barney Millen
The Maltese Falcon (1941) as Detective Tom Polhaus
Swamp Water (1941) as Tim Dorson
Know for Sure (1941, Short) as Patient (uncredited)
Wild Bill Hickok Rides (1942) as Sheriff Edmunds
The Falcon Takes Over (1942) as Moose Malloy (uncredited)
Ten Gentlemen from West Point (1942) as Sgt. Scully
Sin Town (1942) as Rock Delanry
Hitler – Dead or Alive (1942) as Steve Maschick
Gentleman Jim (1942) as John L. Sullivan
In This Our Life (1942) as Extra at a Roadhouse Table (uncredited)
Hello Frisco, Hello (1943) as Sharkey
Slightly Dangerous (1943) as Jimmy
They Came to Blow Up America (1943) as FBI Chief Craig
A Guy Named Joe (1943) as Al Yackey
The Sullivans, renamed The Fighting Sullivans (1944) as Lt. Commander Robinson
Home in Indiana (1944) as Jed Bruce
Tall in the Saddle (1944) as Judge Robert Garvey
Dakota (1945) as Jim Bender
They Were Expendable (1945) as BMC "Boats" Mulcahey
Canyon Passage (1946) as Honey Bragg
My Darling Clementine (1946) as Morgan Earp
It's a Wonderful Life (1946) as Bert, the cop
Unconquered (1947) as John Fraser
The Fugitive (1947) as El Gringo
Fort Apache (1948) as Sgt. Major Michael O'Rourke
Sins of the Fathers (1948)
The Time of Your Life (1948) as McCarthy
Tap Roots (1948) as Hoab Dabney
Joan of Arc (1948) as Captain La Hire
3 Godfathers (1948) as Perley "Buck" Sweet
Singing Guns (1950) as Sheriff Jim Caradac
Riding High (1950) as Lee
Wagon Master (1950) as Mormon Elder Wiggs
Kiss Tomorrow Goodbye (1950) as Inspector Charles Weber
Operation Pacific (1951) as Commander John T. "Pop" Perry
The Great Missouri Raid (1951) as Major Marshal Troebridge
Only the Valiant (1951) as Corporal Timothy Gilchrist
Bullfighter and the Lady (1951) as Narrator (voice, uncredited)
On Dangerous Ground (1951) as Walter Brent
The Quiet Man (1952) as Father Peter Lonergan
Hellgate (1952) as Lt. Tod Voorhees
Thunderbirds (1952) as Lt. John McCreery
Blowing Wild (1953) as Dutch Peterson
The Moonlighter (1953) as Cole Gardner
Hondo  (1953) as Buffalo Baker
Gypsy Colt (1954) as Frank McWade
Johnny Guitar (1954) as John McIvers
The Bob Mathias Story (1954) as Coach Virgil Jackson
The Long Gray Line (1955) as Captain Herman J. Kohler
Mister Roberts (1955) as Chief Petty Officer Dowdy
A Man Alone (1955) as Sheriff Gil Corrigan
The Searchers (1956) as Reverend Captain Samuel Johnson Clayton
Dakota Incident (1956) as Senator Blakely
Pillars of the Sky (1956) as Dr. Joseph Holdon
The Halliday Brand (1957) as Big Dan Halliday
The Wings of Eagles (1957) as John Dodge
China Doll (1958) as Father Cairns
Rio Bravo (1959) as Pat Wheeler
Alias Jesse James (1959) as Major Seth Adams (uncredited)

Television

The Silver Theatre – episode – My Brother's Keeper (1950)
The Bigelow Theatre – episode – His Brother's Keeper – Unknown (1951)
The Gulf Playhouse – episode – You Can Look it Up – Unknown (1952)
Schlitz Playhouse – episodes – Apple of His Eye, and Moment of Vengeance – Various (1952–1956)
The Ford Television Theatre – episode – Gun Job – Hank Fetterman (1953)
General Electric Theater – episodes – Winners Never Lose, and A Turkey for the President (1953–1958))
The Ford Television Theatre – episode – Segment – Lt. Pannetti (1954)
Suspense – episode – The Hunted – Bill Meeker (1954)
Screen Directors Playhouse – episode – Rookie of the Year – Buck Goodhue, Alias Buck Garrison (1955)
Cavalcade of America – episode – The Marine Who Was Two Hundred Years Old – Sgt. Lou Diamond (1955)
Climax! – episode – The Mojave Kid – Sheriff (1955)
The Christophers – episodes – Washington as a Young Man, and Bring Out their Greatness – Various (1955–1958)
Schlitz Playhouse – episode –  Plague Ship – Captain Parker (1956)
Star Stage – episode – The Marshal and the Mob – Patterson (1956)
Cavalcade of America – episode – Once a Hero – Harvey Kendall  (1958)
Wagon Train – 133 episodes – Major Seth Adams (1957–1961, his death) (final appearance)
The Steve Allen Plymouth Show – episode – NBC Fall Preview – Himself (1957)
The Steve Allen Plymouth Show – episode – Episode #3.16 – Himself (1958)

Radio
Family Theater – episode – The Visitor (1952)

Notes
Citations

Bibliography

External links

Literature on Ward Bond

1903 births
1960 deaths
People from Dundy County, Nebraska
20th-century American male actors
American male film actors
American male television actors
American anti-communists
California Republicans
Male actors from Los Angeles
Male actors from Nebraska
Male Western (genre) film actors
Nebraska Republicans
People with epilepsy
University of Southern California alumni
USC Trojans football players
Western (genre) television actors